Gay Marriage: For Better or for Worse? What We've Learned from the Evidence is a 2006 book about same-sex marriage and civil partnership by William N. Eskridge Jr. and Darren R. Spedale, published by Oxford University Press.

Reviews

2006 non-fiction books
2000s LGBT literature
American non-fiction books
Books about same-sex marriage
Collaborative non-fiction books
English-language books
LGBT literature in the United States
Oxford University Press books